Eastern Division of Camden, an electoral district of the Legislative Assembly in the Australian state of New South Wales was created in 1856 and abolished in 1859.


Members

Election results

Elections in the 1850s

1859 by-election

1858

1856

Notes

References

New South Wales state electoral results by district